Stanislas-Arthur-Xavier Touchet (13 November 1842 – 23 September 1926) was a French prelate of the Roman Catholic Church who served as Bishop of Orléans from 1894 until his death, and became a cardinal in 1922.

Biography
Stanislas Touchet was born in Soliers, and studied at the Seminary of Saint-Sulpice in Paris. He was ordained to the priesthood on 13 June 1872, and then did pastoral work in the Archdiocese of Besançon until 1894.

On 18 May 1894, Touchet was appointed Bishop of Orléans by Pope Leo XIII. He received his episcopal consecration on the following 15 July from Bishop Flavien-Abel Hugonin, with Bishops Abel-Anastase Germain and Charles-Bonaventure Theuret serving as co-consecrators, in the Besançon Cathedral.

After becoming an Assistant at the Pontifical Throne on 19 June 1922, Touchet was created Cardinal Priest of Santa Maria sopra Minerva by Pope Pius XI in the consistory of 11 December of that same year. He would serve as Bishop of Orléans for a period of thirty-two years.

He died in Orléans, at the age of 77, and is buried in its Cathedral.

Some of the Books Written by Him:

 La sainte de la patrie
 Vie de sainte Jeanne d'Arc
 Pour les Arméniens
 Panégyrique de Jeanne d'Arc
 Ce que fut Jeanne d'Arc
 Oeuvres choisies 
 La mission de la vénérable Jeanne d'Ar
 Aux infirmières de France

References

External links
Catholic-Hierarchy 
Cardinals of the Holy Roman Church

1842 births
1926 deaths
19th-century French Roman Catholic bishops
20th-century French cardinals
Bishops of Orléans